Bert Sutcliffe  (17 November 1923 – 20 April 2001) was a New Zealand Test cricketer. Sutcliffe was a successful left-hand batsman. His batting achievements on tour in England in 1949, which included four fifties and a century in the Tests, earned him the accolade of being one of Wisden's Five Cricketers of the Year.  He captained New Zealand in four Tests in the early 1950s, losing three of them and drawing the other. None of Sutcliffe's 42 Tests resulted in a New Zealand victory. In 1949 Sutcliffe was named the inaugural New Zealand Sportsman of the Year, and in 2000 was named as New Zealand champion sportsperson of the decade for the 1940s.

Early life
Sutcliffe was born at Ponsonby, New Zealand. He was a brilliant schoolboy cricketer, and spent two years at teacher training college before joining the army. He scored heavily in matches he was able to play while serving with New Zealand forces in Egypt and Italy in the Second World War. His first-class career didn't get under way until he returned to New Zealand in 1946 from service in Japan after the war.

Batting highlights
Sutcliffe established himself in his first international match when he scored 197 and 128 in the same match for Otago against MCC at Dunedin in March 1947. In the first innings he brought up his century with a six. He made his Test debut a few days later, scoring 58 in New Zealand's only innings and adding 133 for the first wicket with Walter Hadlee. In consecutive seasons of first-class cricket in New Zealand he made 722 runs at an average of 103.14 in 1946–47 with three centuries, 911 runs at 111.22 in 1947–48 with four centuries, and 511 runs at 85.16 in 1948–49 with three centuries.

On the 1949 tour of England, he scored 243 and 100 not out in the same match against Essex at Southend, and went on to total 2,627 runs on the tour at an average of 59.70.  He made two triple-hundreds in his career with 355 for Otago against Auckland in 1949–50 and 385 against Canterbury in 1952–53.  The score of 385 stood as the record highest score by a left-handed batsman until 1994, when Brian Lara hit 501. Playing for New Zealand against India at New Delhi in 1955–56, he scored 230 not out, which was then a Test record for New Zealand.

New Zealand tour of South Africa: 1953–54
Sutcliffe is especially noted for an innings of 80 not out against South Africa in Johannesburg on Boxing Day 1953. New Zealand's batsmen were routed by South African fast bowler Neil Adcock on a green wicket. Sutcliffe was hit in the head by Adcock and, having left the field to receive hospital treatment, returned to the crease swathed in bandages. He took on the bowling, hitting a number of sixes, until the ninth wicket fell. The New Zealand fast bowler Bob Blair, next man in, was understood to be back at the team hotel distraught as his fiancee had been killed in the Tangiwai disaster two days earlier. Sutcliffe started to walk off only to see Blair walk out. Despite the presence of 23,000 fans, silence enveloped the ground. 33 runs were added in 10 minutes before Blair was out. New Zealand lost the Test match by a considerable margin. Notwithstanding this, the noted New Zealand cricket writer Dick Brittenden said: "It was a great and glorious victory, a story every New Zealand boy should learn at his mother's knee".

Retirement

He wrote his memoirs, Between Overs: Memoirs of a Cricketing Kiwi, in 1963, although his Test career still had two years to go.

After Sutcliffe retired from cricket he became a coach.

In the 1985 New Year Honours, Sutcliffe was appointed a Member of the Order of the British Empire, for services to cricket.

In 2010 The Last Everyday Hero: The Bert Sutcliffe Story, a biography by Richard Boock, was published. The Cricket Society chose it as its cricket book of the year in 2011.

New Zealand Cricket awards the Bert Sutcliffe Medal annually to those it deems have made outstanding service to cricket in New Zealand over a lifetime.

Style and technique
Sutcliffe is described in Barclays World of Cricket as one of New Zealand's "most productive and cultured batsmen". He is also noted to be moving back and across the stumps more than many batsmen in his time like Geoffrey Boycott, which lays a foundation to more modern and contemporary batsmen since the 80's to deal with fast bowlers.

References

External links

 
 
 ACS Famous Cricketers Series, No. 23, Bert Sutcliffe

1923 births
2001 deaths
Auckland cricketers
Commonwealth XI cricketers
International Cavaliers cricketers
New Zealand Members of the Order of the British Empire
New Zealand Test cricket captains
New Zealand Test cricketers
Northern Districts cricketers
Otago cricketers
Wisden Cricketers of the Year
South Island cricketers
North Island cricketers
New Zealand military personnel of World War II